Cameraria picturatella is a moth of the family Gracillariidae. It is known from Connecticut, Massachusetts, New Jersey, New York and Maine in the United States.

The larvae feed on Myrica caroliniensis and Myrica pensylvanica. They mine the leaves of their host plant. The mine has the form of a brownish blotch mine on the upperside of the leaf.

References

External links
Bug Guide

Cameraria (moth)

Leaf miners
Moths of North America
Lepidoptera of the United States
Moths described in 1916
Taxa named by Annette Frances Braun